Friedel or Friedl is a Southern German diminutive variation of the surname Fried - or alternately, a diminutive of Elfriede - and may refer to:

Four French scientists with the same Friedel family name are in direct lineage, Charles, Georges, Edmond and Jacques: 

 Charles Friedel (1832–1899), French chemist known for the Friedel–Crafts reaction
 Georges Friedel (1865–1933), French crystallographer and mineralogist; son of Charles
 Edmond Friedel (1895–1972), French Polytechnician and mining engineer, founder of BRGM, the French geological survey; son of Georges
 Jacques Friedel, (1921–2014), French physicist; son of Edmond, see the French site for Jacques Friedel

Other people:

 Brad Friedel, American international football (soccer) goalkeeper
 Frederic Friedel, produced documentaries for German TV
 Samuel Friedel, former U.S. Congressman who represented the 7th congressional district of Maryland
 Joshua Friedel, American professional chess player
 Richard Friedel, (1955- ), U.S. Behavioral Therapist

Related items

 Friedel's law, named after Georges Friedel, the crystallographer, is a property of Fourier transforms of real functions
 Friedel's salt, discovered by Georges Friedel, is an anion exchanger mineral belonging to the family of the layered double hydroxides (LDHs)
 Friedel oscillations, peculiar behavior of electrons near impurities and interfaces in metals

See also 
 Friedl
German-language surnames

Surnames from given names